Gold Fever is a documentary television series airing on The Outdoor Channel since 1996. It is hosted by Tom Massie and features some of the best places where gold can be found. The program is sponsored by the Gold Prospectors Association of America, an organization dedicated to prospecting.

External links

1996 American television series debuts
2015 American television series endings
1990s American documentary television series
2000s American documentary television series
2010s American documentary television series
Outdoor Channel original programming